Syedna Yusuf Najmuddin Bin Syedna Zakiuddin (died on 18 Jumadil Akhir 1213 AH/27 November 1798 AD, Surat, India) was the 42nd Da'i al-Mutlaq (Absolute Missionary) of the Dawoodi Bohra sect of Musta‘lī Islam. He succeeded the 41st Da'i Abduttayyeb Zakiuddin Bin Badruddin, to the religious post.

Family and early life
He was born in Jamnagar in 1764 AD and was tutored by his father Syedna Abduttayyeb Zakiuddin Bin Badruddin. His mother was Ratan Aai Saheba binte Syedi Khan Bhaisaheb. He had three brothers: Syedna Abde Ali Saifuddin, Syedi Sheikh Adam Safiyuddin and Syedi Abdul Qadir Hakimuddin.

He married Manak Aai Saheba, daughter of Shaikh Mitha bhai bin Shaikh Adam Safiyuddin bin Syedna Nooruddin. By this marriage, Syedna Yusuf had two daughters, Zainab Baisaheba and Hawwa Baisaheba.

Accession
Syedna Yusuf Najmuddin became Da'i al-Mutlaq in 1200 AH at the age of 23. His period of Dawat was from 1200-1213 AH (1787-1799 AD). In 1204 AH, he visited Ahmedabad and initiated restoration of graves and mausoleums of previous Dais. In 1207 AH, he visited Dongam, where he erected a mausoleum of Syedi Nooruddin. On route to Surat, he briefly stayed in Pune during the tenure of Peshwa Madhavrao II. 

During his time in office, the Da'wat office shifted from Burhanpur to Surat.

Death
Syedna Yusuf died at the age of 36. He was the seventh Dai from the lineage of Maula Raja bin Maula Ali of the Bharmal clan. His grave is located in Qubba Najmiyah, Mazar-e-Saifee in Surat.

References

Further reading 
Daftary, Farhad, The Ismaili, Their History and Doctrine (Chapter -Mustalian Ismailism- p. 300-310)
Lathan, Young, Religion, Learning and Science
Bacharach, Joseph W. Meri, Medieval Islamic Civilisation

Dawoodi Bohra da'is
Dawoodi Bohras
1764 births
1798 deaths
18th-century Ismailis